Fussball Club Basel 1893 has a long and illustrious history, that spans the period from 1893 to the present day. Having competed at the highest level of football in Switzerland for most of this time, FCB currently play in the Swiss Super League. The club was founded on 15 November 1893.

Due to its size the history of FC Basel has been divided into five sections. This first section deals with the foundation, the early years, the forming of the Swiss Football Association (ASF-SFV), the first league championships and the years up to and during the first World War. For detail on individual periods of the club's history, see the following articles:

 History of FC Basel (1918–1939)
 History of FC Basel (1939–1965)
 History of FC Basel (1965–2000)
 History of FC Basel (2000–present)

The early years

The first season

FC Basel was started by an advertisement placed by Roland Geldner in the 12 November 1893 edition of the Basler national newspaper, requesting that a football team be formed and that anyone who wished to join should meet up the following Wednesday at 8:15 in the restaurant Schuhmachern-Zunft. Eleven men attended the meeting, generally from the academic community, founding Fussball Club Basel on 15 November 1893.

Founder members
(Source: the documentation to the club's 50th anniversary)
 Emil Abderhalden was first team player in the early days, a famous physiologist and head of the physiological institute at the University of Halle in Germany. 
 Max Born nothing is known about his private life. 
 Josy Ebinger was long-time player in the first team. He was active as a club official in various offices, club chairman from October 1902 to May 1903. He was vice president of the Swiss Football Association in 1900.
 Max Geldner played at least six games for the club's first team in the first two years and was still a loyal friend and a patron of FC Basel 50 years later. 
 Roland Geldner was the first president of FC Basel. He was a well-known personality in the city and football player from the early days of football. A distinguished person, he was the soul of the club in the early years. 
 Wilhelm Glaser wore the red and blue colors as a center forward for years, played at least 14 matches. He was still follower with great interest of the FC Basel activities 50 years later
 Jean Grieder was first and second team player, with at least one match for the first team. He was asset and liability manager and became the clubs first actuary. For years he held high honorary positions in his hometown. 
 Ferdinand Isler was a professor at the canton school in Frauenfeld. He was the first team's first captain, played at least 17 games during the club's first three seasons. He later became actuary of the club. He was a great propagandist. He wrote brochures about the football game and translated the English rules of the game into German. He was one of the first sports journalists. 
 Wilhelm Oser was pharmacist by profession. His cheerful, spirited manner was highly valued in the club. An avid pioneer of the football movement. 
 Fritz Schäublin for many years he was the highly respected rector of the humanistic grammar school in Basel. With his excellent skills he served the club in various offices for many years. He was an excellent player in the early days, played four matches in the club's first two season. He was founder of the tennis department. 
 Lucien Schmoll nothing is known about his private life. 
 Richard Strub was still and quite, loyal member of the club. Very little is known about his private life.
 John Tollmann was a proficient goalkeeper and played at least 23 matches during the club's first five years. He was the first secretary-treasurer of the Swiss Football Association. A personality with a very special character. Together with Roland Geldner, he was the club's driving force in the early days. 
 Charlie Volderauer was an excellent defender and played at least 33 matches. He was president December 1896 to December 1899. Arranged the first games in Switzerland against English professionals: Newcastle United and Celtic Glasgow. A rarely eager club member.

The club colours from the first day on were red and blue.

Eleven days after the club was founded the first game took place. Not much has been passed down from the first game that the FCB played on 26 November 1893. The club members met at the Landhof and played a game amongst themselves. It is considered as the first, but unofficial, game of FC Basel. The names of the players of both teams were recorded at that time, which can also be read in the annals of FC Basel, and the result was also passed on for posterity, Team 1 beat Team 2 by seven goals to two. Two weeks after this internal training match, the real premiere took place. Ferdinand Isler was selected as the team's first captain. The first football match that the club held was on 10 December against the football team of the club RTV/Realschüler-Turnverein (secondary school student gymnastics club). FCB won two goals to nil, the goal scorers were Glaser and Siegrist.

The next match was held six months later. Charles Volderauer, who as businessman had good connections, used them from the very beginning. As early as June 1894, he organised the journey to visit Strassburger FV. The team travelled by train to Strasbourg and played their first match against a foreign team, which ended with a 0–8 defeat.

The second season

For this season club organised ten friendly matches for their first team. The first was a match against FC Gymnasia (from the Greek "gymnasion": place of physical training) a team formed by gymnasts and junior high school students and in 1884 the first football was purchased for their gymnastics lessons. Before and between the two games against Grasshopper Club, Basel played two games against RTV. These were their second and third comparisons and they were all quite rough fights. In the autumn Basel were hosts to FC Excelsior Zürich, the second well established club from Zürich. The return match was played during the spring and attracted over 2,000 spectators, a respectable number because at that time the city had about 70,000 inhabitants. They were also hosts to locals Buckjumpers Club Basel, another club formed by gymnastic and high school students, and were hosts to French team FC Mulhouse, who were to become a regular friendly opponent in the next few years.

At the end of March, another team to guest in Basel was the German team Karlsruher FC Kickers. The Kickers had played against the FC Old Boys Basel that morning and won 10–0. The Karlsruher FC Kickers competed with only four of their own players, the remaining seven were players from three other Karlsruhe clubs, so it was actually a Karlsruhe selection. This game ended in a 1–1 draw.

In May there was a game against Abstinenten-Fussballclub Patria Basel and the first game against newly formed FC Old Boys Basel.

Third season, ASF-SFV

Roland Geldner had been the club's chairman, but he stood down at the club's AGM held on 1 September 1895 and Emanuel Schiess was elected as new chairman. At this AGM on it was announced that 31 footballers had joined the club since the first day, 14 members had since left and so they had 17 active footballers.

The Swiss Football Association (ASF-SFV) was founded on 7 April 1895. FC Basel were founder members, although they were not present at the founder meeting. Basel goalkeeper and local businessman John Tollmann joined the ASF-SFV board of directors and was the first secretary-treasurer. Local rivals Old Boys were soon to become ASF-SFV members. The idea of a Swiss national championship following the form of the English championship was discussed as priority.

Ferdinand Isler was selected as team captain, he was responsible for leading the team trainings and choosing the player line-ups. For this season club organised ten friendly matches for their first team. Six of these matches were held in Basel. In the autumn season Basel played twice against FC Excelsior Zürich, were defeated away and drew at home and in the spring they played them again twice and managed two victories. Basel played twice against French team FC Mulhouse, drawing away and winning at home. They also played twice against Grasshopper Club and won both games. Last season the team had lost the game against Buckjumpers Club Basel, this season they won the revenge. But the Buckjumpers were to dissolve their club at the end of the season, due to lack of members and therefore a number of their remaining members joined Basel before the beginning of the following season. At the end of November 1895 Basel also played their very first game against Anglo-American Club Zürich, the game ended with a defeat. The ten games ended with six victories, two draws and two defeats.

Fourth season

The idea of a Swiss national championship came to review with the Swiss Football Association (ASF-SFV), that had been founded the previous year and of which Basel and local rivals Old Boys were a member. But such a championship had not yet been called to into life.

The club's chairman was Charlie Volderauer and he was chairman between 1896 and 1900. He was the third chairman in the club's history, following Roland Geldner (1893–1896) and Emanuel Schiess (1896). Volderauer was also the team captain this season. For this season club organised seven friendly matches for their first team. Four of these matches were held in Basel, one in the Landhof, two on the Schützenmatte and from the fourth the place of playing field is uncertain. Basel played two games in Mulhouse. The first against Strassburger FV was lost 3–4 and the second against FC Mulhouse was lost 2–3. Five games were played in November/December and the other two in March and June. Of the seven games, two were won, two were drawn and the team suffered three defeats. The team scored 16 and conceded nine goals.

National championships

Fifth, unofficial national championship

Although the first national championship in Switzerland took place in 1897–98 it is considered as unofficial because it was not organized by the Swiss Football Association (ASF-SFV). FC Basel did not participate in this first championship, neither did local rivals Old Boys.

For this season FC Basel organised 10 friendly matches for their first team. Five were played at home in the Landhof and all five were won. Two friendlies were played in Zürich and both ended in high scoring defeats, 3–7 against Zürich and 0–7 against Grasshopper Club. The return game against local club Old Boys was drawn and the return game against Biel-Bienne was won 5–2. The friendly match against FC Bern was played on neutral ground in Aarau and Basel won this game 4–1. Of their 10 games Basel won seven, drew once and were defeated twice.

Sixth, Swiss Serie A

In 1898 Basel then joined the second Serie A championship which was organized by the ASF-SFV. The 1898–99 Series A championship was played as a knock out competition, divided into three regional groups, East (region Zürich) Central (regional north-west Switzerland) and West (Romandy). The winners of each group played the finals in a Round-robin tournament. Basel played in the central group against Old Boys. On 13 November 1898 the game was played in the Landhof stadium and ended in a 1–1 draw. Therefore a replay was required and this was played a month later on 18 December and also drawn 2–2 despite an agreed 20 Minute extra time. Because the Old Boys complained that one of the two FCB goals had been scored by the players hand they protested. The Swiss Football Association had to deal with the matter and subsequently the protest was approved. The disputed goal was simply deducted from the result and thus the Old Boys proceeded to the finals.

The team played four friendly matches in the first half of the season and three after the new year. Three of the games were played at home and four were played away. Four of the friendlies ended with a victory and three ended with a defeat.

Seventh season

Basel did not compete in the 1899–1900 Serie A championship this season. Georges Fürstenberger was appointed as team captain by the club's board of directors under chairman Charlie Volderauer. Basel played 16 friendly games in the season, six were won, two drawn and eight ended with a defeat. Eleven of these friendly games were played at home in the Landhof, five were played away. As in the previous season, all the friendly games were played against Swiss teams. Among the opponents were reigning Swiss champions Anglo-American Club Zürich and Basel won both the home game and the return match. They also played twice against Zürich, but both games ended with a defeat. Further there were two games against local rivals Old Boys and these were both lost as well. The two games against FC Concordia Zürich ended with a win at home but a defeat away. The two games against Biel-Bienne ended with a home defeat, but an away win.

Eighth, second championship participation

The club's new chairman was Ernst-Alfred Thalmann, who took over the presidency from Volderauer at the AGM. Alphonse Schorpp was nominated as team captain by the club's board of directors. In this season the team played eight friendlies and ten games in the league. The Serie A 1900–01 was divided into two groups, an east and a west group. Basel were with three teams from Zürich, Grasshopper Club Zürich, FC Zürich, Fire Flies Zürich and two other teams from Basel, Old Boys and Fortuna Basel. The start into the season with a home draw against Fire Flies and an away victory against local rivals Old Boys can be considered as good. However, in the remaining eight games the team managed only one more draw and a forfait win.

A further curiosity in this season was that captain Schorpp scored his first league goal for his club on 3 March 1901 in the away game against Grasshopper Club. In fact he scored two goals, but this could not save the team from a 3–13 defeat. The reasons for this high defeat can be explained with the fact that one of the players missed the train and that the team played with a number of players from their reserve team. Nevertheless, to date this remains the teams' highest and biggest defeat in the club's history. From this east group the Grasshopper Club qualified themselves for the finals against FC Bern, who were the winners of the west group. The final on 31 March was replayed because a player in GC team was non-qualified and GC won the replay to become Swiss champions for the second successive season.

Ninth, football ground

During the early years of the football sport, an adequate field that could be used as a football pitch was the biggest problem for all clubs. Straight after the club's foundation, she made the Landhof available, free of charge for the first few years, as a playing surface. From 1895 to 1901 the Vélodrome de Bâle, a cycle track, was also located around the grounds. As the Vélodrome club dissolved a new tenant was found and at the start of the 1901–02 season a new football ground had to be found, because the new tenants had built a concrete bowling lane right across the middle of the football pitch. FCB eventually found a space in the Thiersteinerallee, right next to the pitch that local rivals BSC Old Boys were using. The Landhof was to the north of the river Rhine and the Thiersteinerallee about eight kilometers south. The move from the former field to the new field was made late in the evening, the heavy goal posts and crossbars being carried manually across the town in the dark, so that no one would notice that the club was lacking money for the removals. This new pitch was used for one and a half years until the concrete bowling alley was eventually removed.

Alphonse Schorpp was the team captain for the third successive season. Basel played two pre-season friendlies and two during the mid-season. During the winter break and again at the end of the season the team travelled twice to France to play Mulhouse. Both games ended with a victory. Of the total 11 friendlies that the team played that season seven were won and four ended with a defeat.

In this season the team played in the Serie A 1901–02, which was divided into three regional groups, East, Central and West. Basel were allocated to the Central group together with the Young Boys Bern and three other teams from the Basel region. FC Basel completed the division in second position, seven games, five victories and two defeats with ten points. But they were one point behind YB who qualified for the finals. FC Zürich won the championship.

Tenth anniversary

The 1902–03 season was the club's tenth season in their existence. The club's chairman was Ernst-Alfred Thalmann, who took over for his second period. Later that year Josy Ebinger took over the seat, becoming the fifth chairman in the club's history. To the start of the previous season the club was forced to find a new playing field. They had eventually found a suitable field beside the Thiersteinerallee, in the south-east of the city. To the beginning of the 1902–03 Swiss Serie A season the teams also played their games there. Towards the end of the year 1902 the club met an agreement with the owner of the Landhof, Mrs Katharina Ehrler-Wittich, and the club was able to return to their original domicile. At the cost of 150 Swiss Francs the club members removed the bowling alley and made the pitch playable once again.

To the begin of this season, 15 clubs with more than 1,000 members had joined the Swiss Football Association (ASF-SFV). Most of the clubs had two or three teams, therefore the third tier of Swiss football was introduced this season and was called Serie C. From a local point of view this meant the following: Serie A with Basel, Old Boys, Fortuna Basel and Excelsior Basel. Serie B with Old Boys II, Basel II und Excelsior Basel II. Serie C with Columbia Basel, Fortuna Basel II, Gymnasia Basel and Nordstern Basel.

FCB participated in the 1902–03 Swiss Serie A and were allocated to the central group together with the Young Boys, FC Bern and two other teams from region Basel, these being Old Boys and Fortuna Basel. Fortuna were disqualified due to incidents in the match against the Old Boys, the results of the played matches being counted. Basel completed the central division after eight games with three victories and five defeats with a total of six points and 13 to 20 goals. Thus they ended their league season in third position in the table, six points behind YB who qualified for the finals.

Eleventh season

The club's chairman was again Ernst-Alfred Thalmann, who took over the chairmanship for the third time in the club's history. With over 40 active footballers and over 70 patron members Basel were the second largest club in Switzerland at this time, larger was only Grasshopper Club Zürich. Basel's first team played in the Serie A and the second team in the Serie B. Daniel Hug (the team's most prominent, their best and their largest player) was named as team captain. The team played just one pre-season friendly at home against Grasshopper Club. There was another mid-season friendly against local lower tier Nordstern Basel. During the winter break Basel played two more friendly matches. These were the return game against the Grasshoppers which was drawn 6–6 and also an away game against west group team Montriond Lausanne which was won 3–2. At the end of the season Basel played against group winners Old Boys, which was played as warm up the finals. They also played a match against French club Mulhouse, which was lost 6–8, the highest scoring game of the season.

The Swiss Serie A season 1903–04 was again divided into three regional groups, east, central and west. Basel were allocated to the central group together with Old Boys Basel and Fortuna Basel as well as Young Boys, FC Bern and Floria Biel/Bienne. Basel ended the season in third position in the league table, obtaining 12 points, scoring 28 and conceding 25 goals, in ten games, with five victories, two draws and three defeats. The Young Boys and the Old Boys ended the group stage level on points and so a play-off match was arranged. The Old Boys won the play-off 3–2 and therefore qualified for the finals.

Twelfth, second last position

The club's chairman was Ernst-Alfred Thalmann, who was chairman for the second consecutive year and Eugen Strauss was first team captain. The team played just two pre-season friendlies, one in France against Mulhouse and one in Zürich against Grasshopper Club. The game against Mulhouse was won 8–1 the return match four months later in the Landhof was only drawn. The match against the Grasshoppers ended in a defeat. In the winter break the team travelled to Germany. They played against 1. FC Pforzheim on Christmas Day and were defeated 7–3. On boxing day they played a game against Karlsruher FV and managed a draw. At the end of the season the team travelled again to Germany and were defeated 5–1 by Freiburger FC.

The seventh league championship, Swiss Serie A season 1904–05, was divided into three regional groups, east, central and west. Basel were allocated to the central group together with the Young Boys, FC Bern, Weissenbühl Bern and Old Boys Basel. This season was a sportingly very disappointing season for Basel. There were just two victories from eight games, both times against Weissenbühl Bern. The away game was won 9–2 and the return match 3–0. Weissenbühl Bern lost all their eight games and were relegated at the end of the season with a goal tally of five scored and 52 conceded. Basel's other six games all ended in defeats and they landed in second last position in the group table, scoring 18 and conceding 20 goals. Old Boys won the group and advanced to the finals. In the finals St. Gallen first drew 1–1 against group west winners Servette, then they won 1–0 against central group winners Old Boys and because the OB beat Servette 2–0, St. Gallen won their first ever championship title.

The Anglo-Cup

Seventeenth, the first Anglo-Cup

The club's chairman was once again Ernst-Alfred Thalmann, it was his eighth presidential term. Emil Hasler was team captain for the second season in a row. During the 1909–10 season Basel played a total of 37 matches, 25 friendly games, 10 in the domestic league and two in the newly created Anglo-Cup. Of the 25 friendlies 11 were played in the Landhof. The team travelled to France to play a good victory against FC Hagenau and to Germany to play Freiburger FC, but here they were defeated. During the winter break they again travelled to Germany. They played a draw with 1. FC Pforzheim on Christmas Day and on boxing day were defeated by a combined team with players from Mannheimer FG Union and FC Phönix Mannheim. The team again travelled to France in January, playing a draw with Strassburger FV. Over Easter the team played a tour in Germany, losing 4–0 against Stuttgarter Kickers, losing 5–3 against 1. FC Nürnberg on Good Friday and losing twice against Deutscher FC Prag, 2–1 on Easter Sunday and 4–1 on Easter Monday. In total 8 games were won, 6 six were drawn and 11 ended in a defeat.

The Swiss Serie A 1909–10 was divided into three regional groups, seven team in the east group, six in the central and six in the west group. Basel were allocated to the central group together with local rivals Old Boys. The other teams playing in the Serie A central group were Luzern, Biel-Bienne, FC Bern and Young Boys. Basel ended the season in the fifth position in the group table, five points ahead of Luzern, who were relegated and three points behind the Young Boys, who won the group. YB continued to the finals and played against east group winners Aarau and west group winners Servette. YB won both games and became Swiss champions for the second time in a row.

The first Anglo-Cup was played this season. In the round of 16 on 10 April 1910 Basel won against Young Fellows Zürich, but were beaten by St. Gallen in the quarterfinals. St. Gallen continued to the final, but were beaten in the replay by Young Boys.

Eighteenth season

By the 1 January 1911 there were 63 clubs with 7157 members that were organized in the Swiss Football Association.

Basel's club chairman was Ernst-Alfred Thalmann, it was his ninth presidential term, his third term in succession. Emil Hasler was team captain for the third consequtive season. During the 1910–11 season Basel played a total of 38 matches, 23 friendly games, 12 in the domestic league and three games in the Anglo-Cup. Of the 23 friendlies Basel won eleven, drawing three and they were defeated nine times. In the pre-season Basel travelled to Germany once, to play a 4–3 victory against Freiburger FC. The other pre-seasons were played against Swiss teams. During the winter break the team again travelled north and played a 2–2 draw against the Würzburger Kickers on Christmas Day and on boxing day a 5–0 win against Ludwigshafener FG 1903. In January the team travelled to France and played a 5–0 win against Mulhouse. In March they travelled to Germany and travelled home with a 1–6 defeat after their game with Mannheimer FG 1896. At the end of season they travelled to Germany once more. On Easter Sunday they lost 2–4 against FV 1900 Kaiserslautern and on Easter Monday 0–1 against Mannheimer FC Phönix 02. One week later the team came home after a 1–5 defeat against Freiburger FC and yet another week later after a 2–3 defeat against Strassburger FV. Basel also played hosts to two British teams. They lost at home in the Landhof 1–7 against Newcastle United and 1–5 against Celtic. All together ten games were played abroad and five other away games were played in Switzerland against Swiss teams. Eight of the friendlies were played at home, four of the guest teams came from abroad, three guest teams came from clubs in Switzerland.

The Swiss Serie A 1910–11 was again divided into three regional groups. Basel were allocated to the Central group together with local rivals Old Boys. The other teams playing in the Central group were Biel-Bienne, FC Bern, Young Boys and Stella Fribourg. The Young Boys won the group and continued to the finals and eventually won the championship.

In the Anglo-Cup Basel were drawn against two of these lower classed locals. In the round of 32 away against FC Liestal, which ended with a 7–1 victory and in the round of 16 against Concordia, in which Basel ended victors 2–0. In the Quarterfinals Basel were drawn away from home against Young Boys Bern. This game ended with a 2–8 defeat. Young Boys went on to win the final against Servette.

Nineteenth season

The club's chairman was again Ernst-Alfred Thalmann, it was his tenth presidential term altogether. Emil Hasler was the team captain for the fourth consequtive season. Basel played a total of 37 matches, 23 friendly games and 14 in the domestic league. Of the friendlies five of the games were played abroad and of the home games five were hosted against foreign clubs. Seven were played against German teams. On 27 August 1911 Basel hosted their first German opponent and this game against FV Baden-Baden was won 7–1. The other three pre-season matches were also won and all three against Swiss teams. During the winter break the team travelled to Italy. On Christmas Eve they were beaten 1–0 by Genoa and on Boxing day they played a 5–5 draw with SG Andrea Doria. At the end of the season the team made a short tour to Germany and played games against Kickers Offenbach and Karlsruher FC Phönix. Basel also hosted French team Mulhouse. Of these 23 friendlies 10 were won, 3 were drawn and 10 were defeats.

The Swiss Serie A 1911–12 was divided into three regional groups. Eight teams in the east group, eight in the central and seven in the east group. Basel were allocated to the central group together with local rivals Old Boys and newly promoted Nordstern Basel. The other teams playing in the Central group were Biel-Bienne, FC Bern, Young Boys, FC La Chaux-de-Fonds and Étoile-Sporting (La Chaux-de-Fonds). Basel started the season badly, losing three of their first four matches and they ended it badly, losing four of their last six games. During the seasin Basel won five league matches, drew two, but lost seven, scoring a total of 30 goals and conceding 34. Étoile-Sporting won the group and qualified for the finals. Aarau became Swiss champions.

Twentieth season

The club's chairman was Ernst-Alfred Thalmann, altogether it was his eleventh presidential term and his fifth season in succession. At the AGM Thalmann stood down and Karl Ibach took over. The club announced that to that point it had grown to have over 300 members and over half of them were active football players. Emil Hasler was the team captain for the fourth year running. In their 1912–13 season Basel played a total of 37 matches, 19 were friendly games, 14 were in the domestic league and 5 in the Anglo Cup.

Of the friendly games just three were played in the Landhof, six others were away games in Switzerland and ten games were played abroad. During the pre-season the team travelled to Germany twice, played against Karlsruher FC Phönix and Freiburger FC, and travelled to France to play Strassburger FV. During the winter break the team made a tour to North Rhine-Westphalia and before Christmas played VfR Mannheim, on Christmas Day played ETB Schwarz-Weiss Essen and on boxing day played Düsseldorfer FC Fortuna 1911. The team came home with two victories and one defeat. At easter the team made a tour to eastern Germany. They played against SC Erfurt on easter Sunday, against Sportlust Dresden on easter Monday and against SC Wacker Leipzig the day after. At the end of the season Basel played host to English club Preston North End. Of the friendly games 10 were won, three were drawn and six ended with a defeat.

The Swiss Serie A 1912–13 was divided into three regional groups, an east, a central and a west group. Basel were allocated to the central group together with local rivals Old Boys and Nordstern Basel. The other teams playing in this group were Young Boys, FC La Chaux-de-Fonds, Étoile-Sporting FC La Chaux-de-Fonds, FC Bern and Biel-Bienne. Basel started badly, with three defeats and a draw in the first four games. Despite seven victories and one draw during the next ten games, the team could not reduce the gap to the top of the league table. Basel ended the season in fourth position. They were four points behind group winners Old Boys, who continued to the finals. Lausanne Sports won the championship.

The Englishman Percy Humphreys was the first professional trainer that the club FC Basel had ever employed. Prior to Humphreys signing, it had always been the team captain who had taken over the function of the trainer. Under club chairman Karl Ibach, Humphreys signed his contract and began his duties on 1 April 1913. He had previously been head-coach for Hartlepool United in the English North Eastern League.

The Anglo-Cup was a forerunner to the Swiss Cup. It was held for the fourth time this season. In the first round Basel were drawn at home against lower classed Solothurn. In the second round, in the quarter-final and in the semi-final against East group teams, these being St. Gallen, Zürich and Winterthur and in that order. All these games were played at home in the Landhof and Basel won each game. In the final, which was played in the Hardau Stadium in Zürich on 29 June 1913, Basel played against lower classed Weissenbühl Bern and won 5–0. Humphreys led Basel to win their first national title. But memories of this soon faded, because the Anglo Cup was not played the following year and in fact it was discontinued completely due to the first world war.

Twenty-first season

The club's chairman was Karl Ibach, but he stood down at the AGM on 25 September 1913. From that date Carl Albert Hintermann took over as club president. Percy Humphreys was the first professional trainer that the club FC Basel had ever employed. Under club chairman Karl Ibach, Humphreys signed his contract. Basel played 32 matches in their 1913–14 season. 14 of these matches were in the domestic league and 18 were friendly games. Six of these were home games, played in the Landhof, one other home game was played on the Margarethenwiese in Basel, five others were away games in Switzerland and five games were played abroad. Basel played seven matches against German teams, one against the English team Bradford City and the other ten opponents were Swiss. Of these friendlies 10 were won and 8 ended with a defeat. In these 18 games Basel scored a total of 57 goals and conceded 47.

The Swiss Serie A 1913–14 was divided into three regional groups, East, Central and West. Basel were allocated to the Central group together with local rivals Old Boys and Nordstern Basel. The other teams playing in the Central group were Young Boys, FC La Chaux-de-Fonds, Étoile-Sporting FC La Chaux-de-Fonds, FC Bern and Biel-Bienne. Basel started well into the championship winning seven of the first eight games, the first four games straight off. After the new year break things turned against them and they were defeated three times. Basel lost contact to the Young Boys at the top of the table and ended the season in joint second position with FC Bern, they were three points behind the group winners. The two highest scoring games were both played against FC La Chaux-de-Fonds. Basel won the home game 11–4 and the away game 10–1. The Young Boys continued to the finals against Cantonal Neuchatel and Aarau, who eventually won the championship in the Finals.

First World War

Twenty-second season

The professional trainer, Englishman Percy Humphreys, was due to continue his job this season, but due to the outbreak of the first World War he had to return home.

The war also caused further impingements to the football season. There were no pre-season matches and championship start was delayed. In their 1914–15 season, Basel played 11 matches. 6 of these were in the domestic league and 5 were friendly matches. Of these friendlies, 3 were won and 2 ended in a defeat. There was one home fixture played in the Landhof and four away games. In these friendly games, Basel scored 12 and conceded 12 goals.

Also due to the war, the Swiss Serie A 1914–15 was played as an interim Championship, there was no relegation and promotion between Serie A and Serie B. The Serie A was divided into four regional groups, an east, a west and two central groups. Basel were allocated to the central group A together with their local rivals Old Boys, Nordstern Basel and the reigning champions Aarau. Basel started into the championship with an away defeat against Aarau. Then they won both home games against the other two local teams. After the new year and the away draw against Nordstern, Basel lost the home game against Aarau and the away game against Old Boys, to finish in third position in the league table. In their six games, Basel scored 15 goals and conceded 14. Aarau continued to the semifinal, but there they were defeated by Brühl St. Gallen. Brühl also won the final 3–0 against Servette to become the new Swiss champions.

Twenty-third, second-last

The club's chairman was Philipp Leichner at the beginning of the season and during the season Franz Rinderer took over as chairman. It had been in planning for a few years and to the beginning of this season FCB founded their youth department and employed some part-time youth trainers. Right from the very first day there were over 50 youngsters who joined the teams. Amongst these youngsters, for example, was Walter Dietrich, who was 13 years old as he joined. Other youngsters were Karl Bielser, Max Galler, Theodor Schär and Ernst Zorzotti, who were all later to advance and become important first team players.

Because the holidays for the members of the Swiss Army were now becoming more frequent, a football championship as played in the pre-war years, could again be carried out as of the 1915–16 season. Team captain was Ernst Kaltenbach. Basel played a total of 28 matches in this season. 14 of these matches were in the domestic league and 14 were friendly matches. Of these friendlies, six were won, three were drawn and five ended in a defeat. The Swiss Serie A 1915–16 was divided into three regional groups, east, central and west. There were seven teams in the east group, eight in the central group and six in the west group. FC Baden could not participate because their field was used for agricultural purposes due to the war. Basel and the two other local teams, Old Boys and Nordstern Basel, were allocated to the Central group. Further teams playing in the central group were two from the capital, Young Boys and FC Bern, two from La Chaux-de-Fonds, FC La Chaux-de-Fonds, Étoile-Sporting FC La Chaux-de-Fonds and finally Biel-Bienne. Basel didn't start well into the championship, winning only one of the first eight games. They ended the season in second-last position with nine points. Cantonal Neuchatel eventually won the championship in the Finals.

Twenty-fourth season

Franz Rinderer continued as the club's chairman. Peter Riesterer was team captain. Basel played a total of 28 matches in the 1916–17 season. 12 of these were in the domestic league and 16 were friendly matches. Over the Christmas, New Year period the team were taken to a training camp in Barcelona. On Christmas Eve and on boxing day they played to friendlies against Barcelona. The first game ended in a defeat and the second was won. Two days later Basel played a friendly in same stadium, Camp de la Indústria, against La Chaux-de-Fonds and they were able to win this game too. On New Year's Eve and on New Year's Day Basel played two friendlies against local club Terrassa. Tarrassa were Serie B champions and played with five loaned first-class players. The first game was drawn and Basel won the second.

The domestic league, Swiss Serie A 1916–17, was divided into three regional groups, an east, a central and a west group. There were eight teams in the east and the west group, but only seven in the central group. Basel and the two other local teams were allocated to the Central group. The other teams playing in the Central group were FC Bern, Young Boys Bern, Biel-Bienne and Aarau. Basel played a good season, suffering only two defeats. Basel ended the season in second position with 15 points. The Young Boys won the central group and continued to the finals. Here they played against La Chaux-de-Fonds and VFC Winterthur-Veltheim. Winterthur won both games in the finals and won the championship title.

Twenty-fifth, second position

The club's chairman was Franz Rinderer and in 1917 he was elected as president of the Swiss Football Association. Before the first World War came to an end, over 420,000 square meters of the total of 920,000 square meters of Swiss footballs field had been converted into potato fields. In 1913 FCB founded an athletics section, in 1915 their youth football section, Therefore the club fought hard to keep their ground Landhof. In 1917 the club organised the Swiss athletic championships in their grounds. The first nine championships, in the years 1906 to 1916 (1914–15 was canceled) were all held in French-speaking Switzerland. 1917 was the first time that the championships were held in the German-speaking region. The event was a success, 17 clubs and over 100 athletics took part and it attracted about 4,000 spectators.

Basel's first team played a total of 23 matches in the 1917–18 season. 12 of these were in the domestic league and 10 were friendly matches. The domestic league, Swiss Serie A 1917–18, was divided into three regional groups, an east, a central and a west. Basel and the two other local teams were allocated to the central group which had just seven teams, as opposed to the other two groups which both had eight teams. Baden could not participate because their field was used for agricultural purposes due to the war. The other teams playing in the Central group were FC Bern, Young Boys Bern, Biel-Bienne and Aarau. Basel played a good season, suffering only two defeats. They ended the season in second position, again, this time with 17 points. The Young Boys won the group and continued to the finals. In the finals YB beat St. Gallen 2–1 but were defeated 2–4 by Servette, who thus won the Swiss championship.

See also
FC Basel
List of FC Basel players
List of FC Basel seasons
Football in Switzerland

References

Sources
 Die ersten 125 Jahre / 2018. Publisher: Josef Zindel im Friedrich Reinhardt Verlag, Basel. 
 FC Basel Archiv / Verein "Basler Fussballarchiv”

External links
 Official Website
 Rotblau.ch Statistik Website
 FC Basel Fan club website
 Schweizerischer Fussballverband - SFV

FC Basel
Basel